Dejan Ristić (born 6 March 1978) is a Serbian football midfielder who played as a midfielder.

Career
Ristić began his career in 2001 with FK Zvezdara in the Second League of FR Yugoslavia. During his time in the Second League he played with OFK Niš, FK Car Konstantin, FK Radnički Pirot, FK Kosanica, and FK Radnički Niš. In 2007, he signed with FK Sevojno in the Serbian First League, and signed with Dinamo Vranje in 2008. He left Dinamo after one season, claiming the club failed to pay his wages. In 2009, he signed with FK Mladi Radnik and played in the Serbian SuperLiga. After the relegation of Mladi he returned to the Serbian First League and stints with FK Sinđelić Niš, and FK Smederevo 1924. In 2015, he went overseas to Canada to sign with the Brantford Galaxy in the Canadian Soccer League.

References

External links
 

1978 births
Living people
Sportspeople from Jagodina
Association football midfielders
Serbian footballers
FK Zvezdara players
OFK Niš players
FK Radnički Pirot players
FK Radnički Niš players
FK Sevojno players
FK Dinamo Vranje players
FK Mladi Radnik players
FK Sinđelić Niš players
FK Smederevo players
Brantford Galaxy players
Serbian SuperLiga players
Serbian First League players
Canadian Soccer League (1998–present) players